Crop Circle is the second studio album by English rapper Nines. It was released on 20 April 2018 by XL Recordings. It is the follow-up to Nines' debut album One Foot Out (2017), which peaked at number 4 on the UK Albums Chart. The album features guest appearances from Dave, Ray BLK, Haile, Tiggs da Author and numerous Ice City Boyz members. Production is handled by 5ive Beatz, Steel Banglez, Beatfreakz, Pinero Beats, Show N Prove and Zeph Ellis.

The album was supported by lead single "I See You Shining", peaking at number 38 on the UK Singles Chart.

Background
Nines' debut album, One Foot Out, was released in February 2017 and entered the UK Albums Chart at number 4, while receiving positive reviews from critics. Nines announced the release of his second album on 17 April 2018 via social media, three days before release.

Promotion
The lead single, "I See You Shining", was released on 6 April 2018 for digital download. It peaked at number 37 on the UK Singles Chart, becoming Nines' highest-charting single to date.

A short film written and directed by Nines titled after the album was released on 17 April 2018 to promote the album.

Critical reception

Ciaran Thapar of Pitchfork summarised that Crop Circle "perhaps lacks some of the standout street anthems that have, in the past, propelled him into hood stardom. But the result is something entirely new, an impressively unconfined body of work. It doubles as a snapshot of London’s cross-pollinating music scene and a signal towards the rapper’s maturation as he continues to transition from being a homegrown talent into an increasingly reputable MC on the world-stage."

Commercial performance
Midweek forecasts by Official Charts Company slated Crop Circle to enter the UK Albums Chart at number 5. It is set to become Nines' second top 10 album after One Foot Out.

Track listing

Notes
 "Trapstar" features additional vocals by Streetz.
 "Re-Up" features additional vocals by Jagraj Bains (AKA JB).
 "Cash Interlude" features additional vocals by Rammy Malachi and Ca$h Mon£y (AKA Cash).

Sample credits
 "Pictures in a Frame" contains a sample of "Long Distance", performed by Brandy and written by Jeff Bhasker, Philip Lawrence, Rodney Jerkins and Bruno Mars.
 "Rubber Bands" contains a sample of "Computer Love", performed by Zapp and written by Roger Troutman and Larry Troutman.
 "Cash Interlude" contains a sample of "Jump Off 2009", performed by Ca$h Mon£y (AKA Cash), written by Cash.
 "Venting" contains a sample of 'Tell Me The Truth' performed by Lapsley.

Personnel 
 Adam Lunn – engineering, mixing
 Dave Turner – master engineering

Charts

Certifications

Release history

References

2018 albums
Nines (rapper) albums
XL Recordings albums